The WAGR P and Pr classes were two classes of 4-6-2 steam locomotives designed for express passenger service on the Western Australian Government Railways mainline network. The initial designs were prepared by E.S. Race and together the two classes had a total build number of thirty-five locomotives, the P and Pr classes entering service in 1924 and 1938 respectively. Both classes were used on express passenger services, greatly improving the economy and speed of long-distance passenger travel in Western Australia, the results of which were most visible on the West Australian stage of the Trans-Australian Railway and Westland Express.

The need for more powerful locomotives in the 1920s resulted in the introduction of twenty-five P class locomotives which provided a significant improvement in power, speed and economy over previous WAGR locomotives, quickly proving to be a highly successful design. The Great Depression of the 1930s, coupled with the effects of the Great War, thwarted the WAGR's later expansion and acquisition plans resulting in many obsolete locomotives remaining in operation into this period. As a result ten new P class locomotives featuring detail improvements to boilers, valves and bogies were introduced in 1938, a year before the outbreak of World War II. The new locomotives became the first WAGR engines to be given names, each bearing that of a prominent West Australian river. These 'River class' locomotives were very successful and proved so invaluable to the operation of the wartime WAGR that eight P class locomotives were modified to their standard. All eighteen locomotives were officially classified as the Pr class in 1946.

The initial ten P class locomotives were built by the North British Locomotive Company in Glasgow while the remainder, including the ten Pr class locomotives, were built locally by the Midland Railway Workshops.

Background
By the early 1920s, the WAGR had obtained only a handful of new locomotive designs since the beginning of the twentieth century and there was a particular lack of large passenger locomotives. The Annual Report of 1920 pointed out the large numbers of obsolete locomotives in service and steadily growing rail traffic, stressing the need for more powerful engines. The most substantial design then in service was the E class 4-6-2s of 1902, of which 65 locomotives had been built for operation in Western Australia and served on a variety of services. Likewise the 20 D class 4-6-4T tank locomotives had helped alleviate pressure on suburban services while the 57 F class 4-8-0s did the same for goods. However, all had been introduced (and subsequently superheated) prior to the First World War, meaning that by the 1920s, they were becoming inadequate. At this time, the most significant operation requiring new locomotives were the long distance passenger services, particularly on the Perth to Kalgoorlie and Perth to Albany expresses, both of which covered distances in excess of 350 kilometres.

In 1923, approval was given for the construction of ten new superheated Pacific type locomotives for operation on heavier mainline rails, suitable for the hauling of the expresses. The locomotives were based on plans drawn up in 1920 under Chief Mechanical Engineer of the WAGR Ernest A. Evans which called for a new design with large diameter driving wheels, a large firebox and a two-wheel trailing wheel for stable operation at speed. The final outline drawings were prepared by E.S. Race in the Midland Railway Workshops and completed in December 1923. Influence for the new P class designs were drawn from both the New Zealand Railways AB and the Tasmanian Government Railways R class.

Details of design
While initial plans called for a round-top firebox (such as featured on the New Zealand AB class), the P class was eventually designed and delivered with Belpaire fireboxes, which improve steam production over the more traditional round-top types, but are harder to fit. The P class locomotives featured a wide firebox located behind the coupled wheels and supported by a trailing-wheel. The large firebox aided with the use of poor-grade local coal from the Collie coalfields. This low quality coal had frequently resulted in poor steaming in earlier locomotives, but the P class design largely avoided this problem, resulting in a locomotive 30% more economical than the earlier F class engines of similar tractive effort. The P and Pr class also featured innovations to alter the weight-distribution between the driving and trailing wheels, improving adhesive traction.

Two types of tender were used by the P and Pr class locomotives. The original tender (as designed) had a water capacity of 2,800 imperial gallons and a coal capacity of 8 tons. These were built with the initial builds of the 10 P and 10 Pr class locomotives. The remaining 15 P class locomotives (all locally constructed) were fitted with modified R Class tenders which were shorter, and had been upgraded to have a water capacity of 2,440 gallons and 7 tons of coal. These short tenders were distinctive and referred to as the 'bob-tailed' tenders.

Construction history
It was the North British Locomotive Company of Glasgow, Scotland which secured the order for the P class locomotives in 1924, ahead of several other companies including Thompson & Co of Victoria. North British was to supply ten locomotives with delivery inside of 33-weeks, which would be in time for the 1924/1925 wheat harvest when the introduction of the P class locomotives would free up other locomotives for use on wheat trains. Accordingly, six locomotives entered traffic in December 1924, followed by an additional four in February 1925.

The next batch of ten P class locomotives were constructed locally in Western Australia in 1927, at the Midland Railway Workshops. They were identical to the North British locomotives excepting the short tenders rebuilt from those of the obsolete R class engines. This order was extended by an additional five locomotives which were delivered in 1929, bringing the total to twenty-five locomotives. Several exchanges of tenders occurred throughout the service life of the P and Pr class locomotives, such as exchanging the long tender of an unconverted P class locomotive for the short tender of a later Pr class engine.

The P class locomotives were given the numbers P441-P465 in order of delivery, with P451-P465 being delivered with short tenders.

Pr class modifications

By the late 1930s, with even more engines requiring urgent maintenance and repairs, orders were placed for an additional ten P class locomotives which would be improved through modifications to the boilers, bogies, headlights and valve gear. These new locomotives were constructed at the Midland Railway Workshops. The boilers featured an increase in pressure from 160 to 175psi, which provided more power, and the bogies were constructed in cast steel. These improved locomotives were delivered to the same operating specifications as the original P class, with the same weight distribution and boiler pressure limited to 160 psi, though improvements to the track and bridges on the Eastern Goldfields Railway in 1940 meant that they could be altered to use their designed power through the increasing of the axle load from 12.8 to 14.2 tons and the resetting of the boiler-top safety valves to 175 psi. The result was a 9% increase in tractive effort with the same economical running of the P class.

The Pr class were numbered Pr138 to Pr147 and were further distinguished from other classes by the placement of running-board nameplates; each locomotive bearing the name of a prominent West Australian river, such as Ashburton, Avon and Chapman. For this reason the class was initially known as the River class. They were the first WAGR locomotives to be given names.

The Pr class proved such a success that it was decided to convert eight of the locally-constructed P class locomotives to Pr standard. Numbers 453-457, 459, 461 and 464 were rebuilt in this way and the naming practise was continued. These conversions retained their short tenders, and were completed between June 1941 and June 1944, when the demands of wartime traffic required more powerful locomotives.

Following the war ten of the class were converted to oil burners in 1947 and again in 1949 due to industrial trouble on the Collie coalfields, where the WAGR obtained its coal fuel. These conversions were temporary, lasting only as long as the lack of fuel prevailed. In later years the boilers were modified to be interchangeable with the Pm and Pmr class locomotives, which were introduced in 1949.

Service history
The P class locomotives proved to be an excellent design, being free steaming and easy to operate. They quickly reduced the need for bank engines which were normally need to provide extra power up the steep gradients across the Darling Scarp. In addition to saving time and resources, this freed up additional badly needed locomotives. Better economy also allowed for higher running distances without stops for resupply and higher speeds made for more efficient running of the expresses on which the P class served, primarily on the Great Southern and Eastern Goldfields railways to Albany and Kalgoorlie respectively. Experiments into engine pooling with the P class on the Great Southern Railway in 1932 led to the adoption of this practice across the system, freeing up further locomotives for other duties.

The introduction of the Pr class revolutionised passenger travel, and as part of a national commitment to shaving a day off the transcontinental express the WAGR introduced The Westland in 1938. The use of Pr class locomotives helped to reduce travel times across the West Australian stage of the journey by more than two hours, accompanied by an increase in the permissible load of 300 tons by additional 20.

During the 1940s, both P and Pr class locomotives were used extensively on troop trains, while civilian patronage also increased during this time. The increased war traffic was so great that it necessitated the conversion of eight P class locomotives to Pr standard at a time when lack of available resources and labour had stalled the production of new locomotives, such as the S class until 1943. Both during and following the war the Pr class remained the premier express locomotive, while the P class continued on secondary passenger services, concentrated in the states' South West around Albany, particularly on the Great Southern Railway.

The introduction in 1949 of thirty-five Pm and Pmr class was originally intended to oust the Pr locomotives from express services the later designs proved unstable at speed and were transferred instead to fast goods workings, leaving the Pr class as the only express locomotive on the WAGR. The introduction of X class diesels in 1954, however, ended their long tenure in this position and both P and Pr class locomotives were gradually relegated to goods and shunting duties. Their adequate tractive effort and economy, however, ensured their survival until the very end of steam.

The P class were withdrawn between January 1968 and October 1969. With the exception of Pr528 Murray, which was destroyed by a fire while on-shed at Kalgoorlie in 1950 following an oil leak while operating as an oil-burner, the Pr class were withdrawn from September 1967 with class leader Pr521 Ashburton the last to be withdrawn on 10 September 1970.

Livery and numbering
When introduced the P class locomotives were painted in overall black with red buffer beams, in keeping with WAGR livery policies of the time. The Pr class wore both the overall black livery and a paint scheme with black smoke boxes, tenders and cabs with grey boilers lined in black. The W class of 1951 introduced the larch green with black smoke boxes and red buffer beams livery to Western Australia and this was applied to the majority of tender locomotives, including the P and Pr classes.

The twenty-five P class locomotives originally bore the numbers P441 to P465, but the surviving class members were renumbered P501 to P517 in 1947. The initial batch of 10 Pr class engines were numbered Pr138 to Pr147, while the eight later conversion retained their P class numbers. The Pr class designation was only adopted officially on locomotive registers in 1946, and accordingly saw the class renumbered Pr521 to Pr538.

Preservation 
P508 and Pr521 were donated to the Australian Railway Historical Society museum in October 1971 and are on display at the Western Australian Rail Transport Museum.

Class lists

P class lists
The numbers and periods in service of each member of the P class were as follows:

Pr class list
The numbers, names and periods in service of each member of the Pr class were as follows:

See also

Rail transport in Western Australia
List of Western Australian locomotive classes

References

Notes

Bibliography

External links

P WAGR and Pr classes
Railway locomotives introduced in 1924
Railway locomotives introduced in 1938
3 ft 6 in gauge locomotives of Australia
4-6-2 locomotives
Passenger locomotives
NBL locomotives